The Filmfare Best Film Award is given by the Filmfare magazine as part of its annual Filmfare Awards South for Malayalam films since: 1966

References

External links

Filmfare Awards South (Malayalam)